St Mel's Park, named for Mél of Ardagh., is the former home of Athlone Town F.C., who played in the ground until 2007 when they moved into the Athlone Town Stadium. The stadium was built in 1929 and hosted the famous 1975–76 UEFA Cup tie between Athlone and AC Milan.

References 

Athlone Town A.F.C.
Defunct association football venues in the Republic of Ireland
Sports venues in County Westmeath
Buildings and structures in Athlone
Sport in Athlone